Kueneng is a community council located in the Berea District of Lesotho. Its population in 2006 was 21,887.

Education
St. Theresa's located in Bela-Bela was the first mission established in 1931. It began with a primary school and a clinic. It has now developed to a secondary high school known as Holy Names High School with 550 students, 55 of whom are boarders. All students take courses in English, Bible study, mathematics, science and Sesotho.

Villages
The community of Koeneng includes the villages of

BakanengBakingBela-Bela (Moreneng)Bela-Bela WestHa Mahlabachana (Bela-Bela)Ha 'MakotolaHa HlajoaneHa KhasaneHa KhororoHa KopiHa LebentleleHa LephalloHa LetsoelaHa LeutsoaHa MakhethaHa MakotolaHa Malibeng
Ha MasasaHa MashetlaHa MatooaneHa MatsoaiHa MohaleHa MonyatsoHa Mora-ThabaHa MoratoeHa MatseketsekeHa MoshoaiHa MpitiHa NkhekheHa NkuebeHa NtelekiHa NtisaHa NtoroHa Pakalitha

Ha PeeteHa Pelele (Lipeleseng)Ha PitsoHa QopanaHa RajoneHa RalekekeHa RaletsaeHa RatomoHa Seisa (Kolojane)Ha ThuhloaneHa TlelakaHa Tšepo (Kolojane)Ha TsoloHa KhotsiLikhutlongLilepeng (Kolojane)Mafika-Lisiu (Masaleng)
MafotholengMafotholeng (Motse-Mocha)'Malebesana (Ha Nyaka)MaphiringMasaleng (Lejoe-Motho)MechalingMoeaneng (Bela-Bela)MoetsuoaMokomahatsiMoneanengMorapamisengMotse-MochaPaballongSeatomaSeforongThabana-NtlenyanaTuke

References

External links
 Google map of community villages

Populated places in Berea District